Robert Lee Brewer (born March 1, 1939) is an American former figure skater. He is a two-time U.S. national bronze medalist (1959, 1960) and competed at the 1960 Winter Olympics, placing seventh. After retiring from competition, he became a Marine fighter pilot, flight surgeon, and a psychiatrist.

Competitive highlights

References

1939 births
Living people
Sportspeople from Alhambra, California
American male single skaters
Olympic figure skaters of the United States
Figure skaters at the 1960 Winter Olympics
20th-century American people
21st-century American people